Szaciły may refer to the following places:
Szaciły, Białystok County in Podlaskie Voivodeship (north-east Poland)
Szaciły, Mońki County in Podlaskie Voivodeship (north-east Poland)
Szaciły, Sokółka County in Podlaskie Voivodeship (north-east Poland)